The Supreme Central and Governing Junta of Spain and the Indies (also known as Supreme Central Junta, the Supreme Council, and Junta of Seville) formally  was the Spanish organ (junta) that accumulated the executive and legislative powers during the Napoleonic occupation of Spain. It was established on 25 September 1808 following the Spanish victory at the Battle of Bailén and after the Council of Castile declared null and void the abdications of Charles IV and Ferdinand VII at Bayonne earlier in May. It was active until 30 January 1810. It was initially formed by the representatives of the provincial juntas and first met in Aranjuez chaired by the Count of Floridablanca, with 35 members in total.

Origins
The Supreme Central Junta grew out of political confusion that followed the abdication of the House of Bourbon. The Spanish government, including the Council of Castile, initially accepted Napoleon's decision to grant the Spanish crown to his brother Joseph. The Spanish population, however, almost uniformly rejected Napoleon's plans and expressed this opposition through the local municipal and provincial governments. Following traditional Spanish political theories, which held that the monarchy was a contract between the monarch and the people (see Philosophy of Law of Francisco Suárez), local governments responded to the crisis by transforming themselves into ad hoc governmental juntas (Spanish for "council," "committee," or "board").

This transformation, nevertheless, led to more confusion, since there was no central authority and most juntas did not recognize the presumptuous claim of some juntas to represent the monarchy as a whole. The Junta of Seville, in particular, claimed authority over the overseas empire, because of the province's historic role as the exclusive entrepôt of the empire. Realizing that unity was needed to coordinate efforts against the French and to deal with British aid, several provincial juntas—Murcia, Valencia, Seville and Castile and León—called for the formation of a central one. After a series of negotiations between the juntas and the discredited Council of Castile, the Supreme Central Junta met in Aranjuez. The Junta served as surrogate for the absent king and royal government, and it succeeded in calling for representatives from local provinces and the overseas possessions to meet in an "Extraordinary and General Cortes of the Spanish Nation," so called because it would be both the single legislative body for the whole empire and the body which would write a constitution for it.

Activities
As agreed to in the negotiations, the Supreme Central Junta was composed of two representatives chosen by the juntas of the capitals of the peninsular kingdoms of the Spanish Monarchy. Early on, the Junta rejected the idea of establishing a regency, which would have meant the concentration of executive power in a small number of persons, and assumed that role, claiming the treatment of "Majesty" for itself. 

The Junta was forced to abandon Madrid in November 1808 and resided at the Alcázar of Seville from 16 December 1808 until 23 January 1810. (Hence the appellation of "Junta of Seville," not to be confused with the earlier provincial junta.)

The Junta took over direction of the war effort and established war taxes, organized an Army of La Mancha and signed a treaty of alliance with the United Kingdom on 14 January 1809. As it became apparent that the war would last longer than initially thought, the Junta again took up the issue of convening a Cortes in April 1809 and issued a royal decree to the effect on 22 May. A committee presided by Gaspar Melchor de Jovellanos organized the legal and logistical efforts to carry this out.

The Junta also agreed that the "overseas kingdoms" would send one representative. These "kingdoms" were defined as "the viceroyalties of New Spain, Peru, New Kingdom of Granada, and Buenos Aires, and the independent captaincies general of the island of Cuba, Puerto Rico, Guatemala, Chile, Province of Venezuela, and Philippines" in the Junta's royal order of 22 January 1809. This scheme was criticized in America for providing unequal representation to the overseas territories. Several important and large cities were left without direct representation in the Supreme Central Junta. In particular Quito and Charcas, which saw themselves as the capitals of kingdoms, resented being subsumed in the larger "kingdom" of Peru. This unrest led to the establishment of juntas in these cities in 1809, which were eventually quashed by the authorities within the year. (See, Luz de América and Bolivian War of Independence.) Nevertheless, throughout early 1809 the governments of the capitals of the viceroyalties and captaincies general elected representatives to the Junta, although none arrived in time to serve on it.

The war took a turn for the worse under the Junta's watch. By the beginning of 1810, Spanish forces had suffered serious military reverses—the Battle of Ocaña, the Battle of Alba de Tormes—in which the French not only inflicted large losses, but also took control of southern Spain and forced the government to retreat to Cádiz, the last redoubt available to it on Spanish soil. In light of this, the Central Junta dissolved itself on 29 January 1810 and set up a five-person Council of Regency of Spain and the Indies, charged with finalizing the convening the Cortes.

The Council of Regency of Spain and the Indies
Council of Regency of Spain and the Indies oversaw the almost complete recovery of the Spanish mainland and the formation of the Cortes of Cádiz, which drafted the Spanish Constitution of 1812. The Council was composed of General Francisco Javier Castaños; the councilors of state Antonio de Escaño; Francisco Saavedra and Esteban Fernández de León; and the Bishop of Orense, Pedro de Quevedo y Quintano, none of whom had served in the Supreme Central Junta. Fernández de León was replaced from the first day by Miguel de Lardizábal y Uribe—a substitute member of the Junta representing New Spain— due to health reasons. Under its watch the Regency approved on a technicality the controversial decision to convene the Cortes as a unicameral body (the original royal decrees by the Junta had failed to mention the traditional estates). Once the Cortes began functioning on 24 September 1810, it assumed legislative powers and oversight of the Regency.

The dissolution of the Supreme Central Junta was a crucial turning point in the wars of independence in Spanish America. Most Spanish Americans saw no reason to recognize a rump government which was under the threat of being captured by the French at any moment, and began to work for the creation of local juntas to preserve the region's independence from the French. Junta movements were successful in New Granada (Colombia), Venezuela, Chile and Río de la Plata (Argentina). Less successful, though serious movements, also occurred in Central America. Although the juntas claimed to carry out their actions in the name of the deposed king, just as the peninsular juntas had done earlier, their creation provided an opportunity for people who favored outright independence to publicly and safely promote their agenda, triggering the twenty-five-year-long conflict that resulted in the emancipation of most of Spanish America.

Members of the Junta

References

Bibliography
 Robertson, William Spence. "The Juntas of 1808 and the Spanish Colonies," English Historical Review (1916) 31#124, pp. 573-585. in JSTOR
  Artola, Miguel. La España de Fernando VII. Madrid: Espasa-Calpe, 1999.  
 Lovett, Gabriel. Napoleon and the Birth of Modern Spain. New York: New York University Press, 1965.

Spanish governments
Peninsular War
1808 in Spain
1809 in Spain
1810 in Spain
Napoleonic Wars
Organizations established in 1808
1808 establishments in Spain
1810 disestablishments in Spain
19th century in Spain